Shylaja Nag is an Indian actress and film producer known for her works in Kannada cinema. Some of the notable films produced by Shylaja Nag includes Yajamana, Puttakkana Highway, Devara Naadalli, Sakkare, Gubbachigalu and Artha). She owns Media House Studio, a production house. She is also partner of D Beats, a music company.

Personal life
Shylaja Nag, born on 14 May, graduated in MA Economic from Bangalore University. Shylaja Nag is married to filmmaker and actor B. Suresha since 1992.  She has a daughter, Chandana Nag. Her mother-in-law, Dr. Vijayamma, is a known journalist and a writer. Her nephew, Advaitha Gurumurthy, is an established cinematographer.

Career

Shylaja Nag has been active in Kannada and English theatre since her childhood. She has worked with notable directors like CGK, Girish Kasaravalli, Sihi Kahi Chandru, T N Seetharam, etc. She has acted in many popular plays, television serials, films and advertisements. She is widely recognised for her character Sukanya Saradesai from the serial Naakuthanthi.  
Shylaja Nag started her own production company called  Media House Studio along with her husband B Suresha. The production house has produced many television serials, reality shows and films. Many aspiring actors, writers, directors, cinematographers have worked in this production house. Shylaja Nag is a partner of the music company D Beats along with the music director V. Harikrishna

Selected filmography

Films 
 Yajamana (2019)
Uppina Kagada (2017)
 Devara Naadalli (2016)
 Sakkare (2013)
 Puttakkana Highway (2011) 
 Naanu Nanna Kanasu (2010) 
 Gubbachigalu (2008)  
 Artha (2002–03)

TV 
Sadhane
Naakutanthi
Mohini v/s Mahalinga
Thakadhimitha
Kadambari Kanaja
Alagulimane
Star Paaka
Preethi Prema
Madarangi
Sarigamapadani
Jeevanadi
Kshama

Awards

References

Living people
Kannada film producers
Film producers from Karnataka
Year of birth missing (living people)